The 1999 Speedway Grand Prix of Poland was the third race of the 1999 Speedway Grand Prix season. It took place on 3 July at the Olympic Stadium in Linköping, Sweden

Starting positions draw 

The Speedway Grand Prix Commission nominated British rider Mark Loram and a Pole Sebastian Ułamek as Wild Card.

Heat details

The intermediate classification

See also 
 Speedway Grand Prix
 List of Speedway Grand Prix riders

References

External links 
 FIM-live.com
 SpeedwayWorld.tv

P1
1999
Speedway Grand Prix Of Poland, 1999
Sport in Wrocław